Dorothy Hale (January 11, 1905 – October 21, 1938) was an American socialite and aspiring actress who died from jumping off a building in New York City. Her husband's death, followed by several unsuccessful relationships, had left her financially dependent on her wealthy friends. The artist Frida Kahlo created a famous painting commissioned by Clare Boothe Luce, titled The Suicide of Dorothy Hale.

Early life
Hale was born Dorothy Donovan, the daughter of a real estate agent, in Pittsburgh. In 1919, after attending a convent and a drama school, Hale left home to pursue a career. Her family hired detectives to find her, but she subsequently returned when her funds ran out. With the assistance of friends, she eventually landed a job in the chorus of a Broadway production of Lady, Be Good. According to former NBC News producer Pamela Hamilton, who researched Hale's  life extensively, Fred Astaire offered Hale the role in Lady, Be Good.

While she was studying sculpture in Paris, she married millionaire stockbroker Gaillard Thomas, son of the wealthy gynecologist T. Gaillard Thomas; the brief marriage ended in divorce.

She married Gardner Hale (1894–1931) in 1927. Gardner Hale was a fresco, mural, and society portrait artist. During this marriage Dorothy Hale continued moving in creative, sophisticated, and high-class social circles. In her west coast period, she socialized with artists Miguel Covarrubias, Rosa Rolanda, Frida Kahlo, and photographer Nickolas Muray.

Career 
Hale's stage work was limited to several seasons in stock companies and some work as a dancer and Ziegfeld girl. In the summer of 1935, Hale and her friend Rosamond Pinchot, another New York socialite and aspiring actress, opened in Abide with Me, a psychological drama written by their friend Clare Boothe Luce. Though the three friends enjoyed the experience tremendously, the play was panned and it died quietly. Pinchot went on to take her life by carbon monoxide poisoning in January 1938.

Personal life 
She lost her husband Gardner Hale when his car went over a Santa Maria cliff in December 1931.

Affairs 
Hale was rumored to be romantically linked with Constantin Alajalov, a well-known New York cover artist.

Early in 1933, Noguchi and Hale took a Caribbean cruise, where he was introduced to many of her wealthy and influential friends from New York, several of whom commissioned portraits, including Luce for a sculpture bust. Noguchi traveled to London and Paris with Hale, hoping to find more patrons. Noguchi had begun a portrait sculpture of Hale, but it was never finished, and its fate is unknown.

In 1934, Hale and Luce accompanied Noguchi on a road trip through Connecticut in a car Noguchi had designed with Buckminster Fuller, the Dymaxion car. The threesome stopped to see Thornton Wilder in Hamden, Connecticut, before going on to Hartford to join Fuller for the out-of-town opening of Gertrude Stein and Virgil Thomson's Four Saints in Three Acts.

By 1937, Hale was involved in a serious romance with Harry Hopkins, WPA administrator and Franklin D. Roosevelt's top adviser. Anticipating a "White House wedding" Hale moved into Hampshire House, a 27-story apartment building at 150 Central Park South, and began putting together a trousseau.  She died several months after becoming engaged. Gossip soon spread that they had broken off their engagement, but this was never confirmed.

In later years the story began to spread that in 1938, Bernard Baruch advised Hale that at 33, she was too old for a professional career and she should look for a wealthy husband. Baruch even gave her $1,000 with the instructions, "... to buy a dress glamorous enough to capture a husband." According to Hale's biographer Pamela Hamilton, there's more to that story.

The tabloid press reported that Hale became despondent over her stalled career, constant debt, and unhappy love life, but according to research by Hamilton, there is no evidence of this; on the contrary, she was looking forward to a "long stay" in Washington, D.C., a role in an upcoming film, and get togethers with friends.

Death

Party
The evening of her death, Hale informally entertained some friends; she had told them that she was planning a long trip and invited them to a party in honor of a U.S. ambassador. Among the guests were Mrs. Brock Pemberton; Prince del Drago of Italy; painter Dorothy Swinburne, who was married to Admiral Luke McNamee (President of the McKay Radio and Telegraph company); and Margaret Case (later Harriman, daughter of Frank Case), an editor at Vogue who would go on to write The Vicious Circle. After the party Hale went on to the theater with Mr. and Mrs. J. P. Morgan to see the Stokes' play Oscar Wilde.

After an evening on the town, Hale returned to her home at the Hampshire House—at about 1:15 am, leaving a large number of friends partying at the 21 Club. According to Pamela Hamilton, Hale's biographer, she died at 6:15 am on October 21, 1938, still wearing her favorite Madame X black velvet dress with a corsage of small yellow roses, given to her by Noguchi. Detectives reported to the press that she "fell or jumped,"  though Hamilton raises the question of possible foul play. Hamilton reports that weeks after Hale's death, the tabloids claimed it was suicide, but there was no definitive evidence. Hamilton based her claims on the evidence she uncovered during 20 years of research, and which she has in her possession.

The New York Times and newspapers nationwide covered her death. It became clear that Baruch had used his influence to mute the reporting of Hale's death and diffuse his involvement in the affair.

In his interview for the Herrera book on Frida Kahlo, Noguchi would say of Hale:

She was very beautiful girl, all my girls are beautiful. I went to London with her in 1933. Bucky (Buckminster Fuller) and I were there the night before she did it. I remember very well she said, 'Well that's the end of the vodka. There isn't any more.' Just like that you know. I wouldn't have thought of it much, except afterward I realized that that's what she was talking about. Dorothy was very pretty, and she traveled in this false world. She didn't want to be second to anybody, and she must have thought she was slipping.Hale biographer Pamela Hamilton questions the assumptions that have been made by "friends" and by the press.

Frida Kahlo painting

Hale's friend Clare Boothe Luce, an ardent admirer of Mexican artist Frida Kahlo, almost immediately commissioned Kahlo to paint a recuerdo (remembrance) portrait of their deceased mutual friend, so that in Kahlo's words: "her life must not be forgotten". Luce understood a recuerdo to be an idealized memorial portrait and was doubtless expecting a conventional over-the-fireplace portrait for her $400. After being shown in March in Paris, the completed painting arrived in August 1939: Luce claims she was so shocked by the unwrapped painting that she "almost passed out".

What Kahlo created was a graphic, narrative retablo, detailing every step of Hale's alleged suicide. It depicts Hale standing on the balcony, falling to her death while also lying on the bloody pavement below. Luce was so offended that she seriously considered destroying it, but instead, she had the sculptor Isamu Noguchi paint out the part of the legend that bore Luce's name. Luce simply left the work crated up in the care of Frank Crowninshield, only to be presented with it again decades later, when Crowninshield's heirs discovered it in storage. She donated it anonymously to the Phoenix Art Museum, where it was eventually outed as a Luce donation. The museum retains ownership, although the painting is frequently on tour in exhibitions of Kahlo's works.

In 2010, the painting was included in a "sweeping view" of Noguchi's career in the "On Becoming an Artist: Isamu Noguchi and His Contemporaries, 1922-1960" show at the Noguchi Museum in Long Island City, Queens, New York City.

Portrayals and dramatizations

Stage play 
The Rise of Dorothy Hale, written by Myra Bairstow, premiered off-Broadway at the St. Luke's Theater on September 30, 2007. The play explores the life and death of Hale through the creative process of Frida Kahlo. Questions are raised as to whether Hale's death was a suicide or a murder. The original cast members were Emmy Award winner Michael Badalucco, Patrick Boll, Sarita Choudhury, Laura Koffman, Sarah Wynter, and Mark LaMura.  The cast and playwright of The Rise of Dorothy Hale were featured guests of NASDAQ on October 18, 2007, to ring the closing bell.

Biography 

Lady Be Good: The Life and Times of Dorothy Hale, written by former NBC News producer Pamela Hamilton, was published on March 31, 2021, to critical acclaim. Drawing on original research, the fictionalized biography portrays Hale as a smart, talented, determined woman, upending the widely held belief that Hale was hapless. At the heart of the novel is Hale's friendship with Clare Boothe Luce and the life they led together in café society. Hamilton spent two decades conducting research on Hale, her life, and her friends.

Lady Be Good received a Kirkus Reviews starred review and was selected as a Kirkus Best Indie Book of the Year as well as a Booklife by Publishers Weekly Editors Pick. It has won the Independent Book Publishers Association (IBPA) Benjamin Franklin Award, the National Indie Excellence Award, the Royal Dragonfly Book Award in the Fiction and Historical Fiction categories, the Mark Twain Book Award for Humor and Satire, and others. Reviewers of the book included famed artist Ashley Longshore, who said "Lady Be Good is an absolute candy dish of luxury, opulence, and grandeur. A lens into the upper echelon of the Roaring 20s." Pulitzer Prize winner and New York Times bestselling author Bill Dedman said: "Meticulously researched and well told, Lady be Good is a magnificent debut novel that takes readers on an enthralling and heartbreaking journey. Hamilton beautifully captures the themes of love and betrayal, class and culture, and the price of fame."

References

External links 
 
 Hale Biographer Pamela Hamilton website
 Kirkus Reviews starred review of Lady Be Good: The Life and Times of Dorothy Hale
 Publishers Weekly review of Lady Be Good: The Life and Times of Dorothy Hale
 Hampshire House website
 Frida Kahlo's The Suicide of Dorothy Hale
 The Phoenix Art Museum website
 
 The New York Times review of The Rise of Dorothy Hale

1905 births
1938 suicides
20th-century American actresses
American film actresses
American socialites
American stage actresses
Actresses from New York (state)
Actresses from Pennsylvania
Suicides by jumping in New York City
1938 deaths
Female suicides